U0 may refer to:
 N53B30-U0, a 3.0-litre model of the BMW N53 engine released in September 2007
 Oberursel U.0, an engine equipping the 1915 German Fokker E.II fighter aircraft
 μ0, the vacuum permeability constant in physics